The 1999 Karnataka Legislative Assembly election took place in October 1999 in 224 constituencies in Karnataka, India. The elections were conducted to elect the government in the state of Karnataka for the next five years.

The Indian National Congress secured a huge majority winning 132 seats. The National Democratic Alliance composed of the Bharatiya Janata Party and Janata Dal (United) faction was a distant second winning only 63 seats. The Janata Dal (Secular) faction of former prime minister Deve Gowda also bit dust winning only 10 seats. The election was held simultaneously with the Lok sabha elections. The Janata Dal government collapsed in mid-1999 owing to a split in the Janata Dal. The Chief minister J.H.Patel, party president C.Byregowda and many other prominent leaders were part of the Janata dal (United) faction and along with Ramakrishna Hegde allied with the Bharatiya Janata Party  whereas the former prime minister Deve Gowda and his associates including the deputy chief minister Siddaramaiah joined the Janata dal (secular) faction. Owing to the anti-incumbency against both the factions of JD, Congress won handsomely. S.M. Krishna of the Congress was sworn in as Chief Minister on 11 October 1999.

Results

!colspan=10|
|-
!style="background-color:#E9E9E9" align=left|Parties
!style="background-color:#E9E9E9" align=right|Flag
!style="background-color:#E9E9E9" align=right|Seats contested
!style="background-color:#E9E9E9" align=right|Seats Won
!style="background-color:#E9E9E9" align=right|% of Votes
|-
|align="left" |Indian National Congress
|align="right" valign=top |
|align="right" valign=top |222
|align="right" valign=top |132
|align="right" valign=top |40.84%
|-
|align="left" |Bharatiya Janata Party (BJP)
|align="right" valign=top |
|align="right" valign=top |149
|align="right" valign=top |44
|align="right" valign=top |20.69%
|-
|align="left" |Janata Dal (United)
|align="right" valign=top |
|align="right" valign=top |112
|align="right" valign=top |18
|align="right" valign=top |13.53%
|-
|align="left" |Janata Dal (Secular)
|align="right" valign=top |
|align="right" valign=top |203
|align="right" valign=top |10
|align="right" valign=top |10.42%
|-
|align="left" |Others
|align="right" valign=top |
|align="right" valign=top |
|align="right" valign=top |20
|align="right" valign=top |14.52%
|-
|align="left" style="background-color:#E9E9E9"|Total (Turnout %)
|width="75" align="right" valign=top style="background-color:#E9E9E9"|
|width="30" align="right" valign=top style="background-color:#E9E9E9"|
|width="30" align="right" valign=top style="background-color:#E9E9E9"|224
|width="30" align="right" valign=top style="background-color:#E9E9E9"|100.0
|-
|align="left" colspan="6"|Source: Election commission of India
|}

Elected members

References

State Assembly elections in Karnataka
1990s in Karnataka
1999 State Assembly elections in India